Going Up is a 1923 American silent comedy film directed by Lloyd Ingraham and starring Douglas MacLean, Hallam Cooley and Marjorie Daw. It was based on a 1917 comedy Broadway play The Aviator.

Synopsis
The author of a series of bestselling novels about aviation has false gained a reputation has an expert pilot when he cannot fly and has a phobia of planes. However, when he is challenged by a genuine expert to a race with a rival in love, he accepts and triumphs.

Cast
 Douglas MacLean as Robert Street
 Hallam Cooley as Hopkinson Brown
 Arthur Stuart Hull as James Brooks
 Francis McDonald as Jules Gaillard
 Hughie Mack as Sam Robinson
 Wade Boteler as John Gordon
 John Steppling as William Douglas
 Mervyn LeRoy as The Bellboy
 Marjorie Daw as 	Grace Douglas
 Edna Murphy as 	Madeline Manners
 Lillian Langdon as 	Mrs. Douglas

References

Bibliography
 Munden, Kenneth White. The American Film Institute Catalog of Motion Pictures Produced in the United States, Part 1. University of California Press, 1997.

External links

1923 films
1923 comedy films
American black-and-white films
Silent American comedy films
American silent feature films
1920s English-language films
Films directed by Lloyd Ingraham
Associated Exhibitors films
1920s American films